The 2018 NCAA Women's Gymnastics Championships were held April 20–21, 2018, at the Chaifetz Arena in St. Louis, Missouri. The UCLA Bruins were the team Champions with a total of 198.075 points. The twelve teams invited were Alabama, Arkansas, California, Florida, Georgia, Kentucky, LSU, Nebraska, Oklahoma, UCLA, Utah, and Washington.

NCAA Championship (Super Six)

Standings

Individual results

All-around

Event Results

Vault

Uneven Bars

Balance Beam

Floor Exercise

References

NCAA Women's Gymnastics championship
2018 in American sports
NCAA Women's Gymnastics Championship